Melvilasam Sariyanu is a Malayalam-language film. It was released on 12 September 2003.

Cast
 Vineeth Kumar as Nandakumar
 Karthika as Geethu
 Suchitha
 Anju Aravind as Nandakumar sister
 Janardanan as Menon
 Jagathy Sreekumar
 Sudheesh as Mimics Magic  Madhana Mohanan
 Kalpana as 
 Hareesre Ashokan Thabalist Pushkaran
 Ponnamma Babu
Jijoy Rajagopal as Prasad
 Jose Pellisseri as Gokulettan

Soundtrack 
The film's soundtrack contains 9 songs, all composed by K. L. Sreeram and Lyrics by Gireesh Puthenchery.

References

2003 films
2000s Malayalam-language films